First Lutheran Church is located in Middleton, Wisconsin, at the corner of Old Sauk Road and Pleasant View Road. The congregation of First Lutheran Church was established in 1852 and this sanctuary was built in 1866 by German immigrants. It has not had an active congregation since 1947. It was added to the National Register of Historic Places in 1988.

References

Churches on the National Register of Historic Places in Wisconsin
Lutheran churches in Wisconsin
Carpenter Gothic church buildings in Wisconsin
Churches completed in 1866
Churches in Dane County, Wisconsin
1866 establishments in Wisconsin
National Register of Historic Places in Dane County, Wisconsin